Typhonium liliifolium is a species of plant in the arum family that is endemic to Australia.

Description
The species is a deciduous geophytic, perennial herb, which resprouts annually from a corm 5 cm in diameter. The narrowly lanceolate leaves, up to 30 cm long by 3–8 cm wide, are borne on stalks up to 30 cm long. The flower is enclosed in a 10–24 cm long spathe.

Distribution and habitat
The species is known from the tropical Northern Kimberley region of north-west Western Australia, as well as the Victoria River area of the Top End of the Northern Territory, where it grows in savanna woodland and open scrub.

References

 
liliifolium
Monocots of Australia
Flora of the Northern Territory
Flora of Western Australia
Taxa named by Heinrich Wilhelm Schott
Taxa named by Ferdinand von Mueller
Plants described in 1860